The 2014 Men's U23 Pan-American Volleyball Cup was the second edition of the bi-annual men's volleyball tournament, played by six countries from October 5 – 10, 2014 in Havana, Cuba.

Competing nations

Competition format
The competition format for the Men's U23 Pan-American Volleyball Cup consists of two phases, the first is a Round-Robin round between all six competing nations. After the Round-Robin finishes, 3rd and 4th place nations according to ranking will play for the bronze and 1st and 2nd place nations according to ranking will play for the gold.

Pool standing procedure
Match won 3–0: 5 points for the winner, 0 point for the loser
Match won 3–1: 4 points for the winner, 1 points for the loser
Match won 3–2: 3 points for the winner, 2 points for the loser
In case of tie, the teams were classified according to the following criteria:
points ratio and sets ratio

Preliminary round
All times are in Cuba Daylight Time (UTC−04:00)

Group A

Final round

Fifth place match

Bronze medal match

Final

Final standing

Individual awards

Most Valuable Player
 
Best Scorer
 
Best Setter
 
Best Opposite
 
Best Outside Hitters
 
 
Best Middle Blockers
 
 
Best Server
 
Best Digger
 
Best Receiver
 
Best Libero

References

External links

Men's Pan-American Volleyball Cup
Pan-American
Men's U23 Pan-American Volleyball Cup
Men's U23 Pan-American Volleyball Cup
International volleyball competitions hosted by Cuba